Pseudocrossotus is a genus of longhorn beetles of the subfamily Lamiinae, containing the following species:

 Pseudocrossotus albomaculatus (Breuning, 1938)
 Pseudocrossotus pujoli (Teocchi, 1991)

References

Crossotini